Batracobdelloides is a genus of annelids belonging to the family Glossiphoniidae.

The species of this genus are found in Europe and Southern Africa.

Species:

Batracobdelloides conchophylus 
Batracobdelloides hlaingbweensis 
Batracobdelloides indochinensis 
Batracobdelloides koreanus 
Batracobdelloides moogi 
Batracobdelloides tricarinata 
Batracobdelloides yaukthwa

References

Annelids